Lewis Henry Lapham (born January 8, 1935) is an American writer. He was the editor of the American monthly Harper's Magazine from 1976 until 1981, and from 1983 until 2006. He is the founder of Lapham's Quarterly, a quarterly publication about history and literature, and has written numerous books on politics and current affairs.

Personal life 
A son of Lewis A. Lapham and Jane Foster, Lapham was born and grew up in San Francisco.  His grandfather Roger Lapham was mayor of San Francisco, and his great grandfather, Lewis Henry Lapham, was a founder of Texaco. Through his grandfather, Lapham is a first cousin once removed of actor Christopher Lloyd, although they are three years apart in age. As a child, he attended the Hotchkiss School.

Lapham was educated at Magdalene College, Cambridge and Yale University, where he was a member of St. Anthony Hall.

In 1972, Lapham married Joan Brooke Reeves, the daughter of Edward J. Reeves, a stockbroker and grocery heir, and Elizabeth M. Brooke (formerly the wife of Thomas Wilton Phipps, a nephew of Nancy Astor).  They have three children:
 Delphina (married Prince Don Bante Maria Boncompagni-Ludovisi)
 Andrew (married Caroline Mulroney, only daughter of former Canadian Prime Minister Brian Mulroney)
 Winston

Harper's Magazine 
Lewis Lapham served as editor of Harper's Magazine from 1976 to 2006 (with a hiatus from 1981 to 1983). He was managing editor from 1971 to 1975, after having worked for the San Francisco Examiner and the New York Herald Tribune. He is largely responsible for the modern look and prominence of the magazine, having introduced many of its signature features, including the "Harper's Index". He announced that he would become editor emeritus in spring 2006, continuing to write his Notebook column for the magazine as well as editing a new journal about history, Lapham's Quarterly. Lapham has also worked with the PEN American Center, sitting on the board of judges for the PEN/Newman's Own First Amendment Award. In 2007, he was inducted into the American Society of Magazine Editors' Hall of Fame.

Republican National Convention 
Lapham wrote a September 2004 column for Harper's in which he included a brief account of the Republican National Convention as if he had witnessed it, "reflecting on the content and sharing with readers a question that occurred to him as he listened", as Jennifer Senior wrote in the New York Times Book Review. The magazine arrived in subscribers' mailboxes before the convention took place, as Senior says "forcing Lapham to admit that the scene was a fiction". The columnist apologized, "but pointed out political conventions are drearily scripted anyway – he basically knew what was going to be said". Senior continues, "By this logic, though, I could have chosen not to read Pretensions to Empire before reviewing it, since I already knew Lapham's sensibility, just as he claims to know the Republicans." Senior's reading of Pretensions to Empire was called into question by her claim that the convention essay was "conspicuously" missing, yet an edited version of the essay opens the book. The New York Times published a correction and Senior described her error as "an honest mistake".

Works 
 

His writing has appeared in The American Conservative Life, Commentary, Vanity Fair, National Review, Yale Literary Magazine, ELLE, Fortune, Forbes, American Spectator, The New York Times, The Walrus, Maclean's, The Observer (London), and the Wall Street Journal.  Lapham also served as a judge for the PEN/Newman's Own First Amendment Award.

Lapham is the host and author of the PBS series America's Century and he was host of the weekly PBS series, Bookmark from 1989 to 1991.

Lapham is currently the host of The World in Time: radio discussions with scholars and historians on Bloomberg Radio that open the doors of history behind the events in the news.  Podcasts of the weekly talks are available at Bloomberg.com.

Lapham wrote The American Ruling Class (2005), a movie done in documentary style and featuring fictional characters and real people, i.e. Bill Bradley, Hodding Carter III and Barbara Ehrenreich, author of Nickel and Dimed, pondering the question "Is there a ruling class in America?", Lapham states at the movie's conclusion that "if you're not in, you're out". The movie aired on the Sundance Channel, July 30, 2007.

Books

Articles

Awards

 1978 Gerald Loeb Award for Magazines

References

External links 

 Lapham's Quarterly
 Essays by Lewis H. Lapham
 
 
 
 
 
 

1935 births
Alumni of Magdalene College, Cambridge
American essayists
American male journalists
American magazine editors
American political writers
American people of English descent
Writers from California
Living people
Writers from the San Francisco Bay Area
San Francisco Examiner people
Yale University alumni
Harper's Magazine people
Hotchkiss School alumni
American male essayists
Gerald Loeb Award winners for Magazines
Carnegie Council for Ethics in International Affairs